Old Rock School may refer to:

 Old Rock School (Guntersville, Alabama), listed on the National Register of Historic Places (NRHP)
 Old Rock School (Dodgeville, Wisconsin), listed on NRHP
 Old Rock School (Prairie du Chien, Wisconsin), listed on the NRHP

See also
 School of Rock (disambiguation)